The Point Hicks Marine National Park is a protected marine national park in situated off Point Hicks in the East Gippsland region of Victoria, Australia.

The marine national park contains the site of two shipwrecks: the SS Kerangie lost in 1879, and the SS Saros lost in 1937.

Point Hicks represents Victoria's warmer eastern marine environment, and contains species that do not occur in the cooler waters to the west.

See also

 Protected areas of Victoria

References

External links

Marine parks in Victoria (Australia)
East Gippsland
Coastline of Victoria (Australia)
Protected areas of Bass Strait